A light characteristic is all of the properties that make a particular navigational light identifiable. Graphical and textual descriptions of navigational light sequences and colours are displayed on nautical charts and in Light Lists with the chart symbol for a lighthouse, lightvessel, buoy or sea mark with a light on it. Different lights use different colours, frequencies and light patterns, so mariners can identify which light they are seeing.

Abbreviations
While light characteristics can be described in prose, e.g. "Flashing white every three seconds", lists of lights and navigation chart annotations use abbreviations. The abbreviation notation is slightly different from one light list to another, with dots added or removed, but it usually follows a pattern similar to the following (see the chart to the right for examples).
 An abbreviation of the type of light, e.g. "Fl." for flashing, "F." for fixed.
 The color of the light, e.g. "W" for white, "G" for green, "R" for red, "Y" for yellow, "Bu" for blue. If no color is given, a white light is generally implied.
 The cycle period, e.g. "10s" for ten seconds.
 Additional parameters are sometimes added:
 The height of the light above the chart datum for height (usually based on high water). e.g. 15m for 15 metres.
 The range in which the light is visible, e.g. "10M" for 10 nautical miles.

An example of a complete light characteristic is "Gp Oc(3) W 10s 15m 10M". This indicates that the light is a group occulting light in which a group of three eclipses repeat every 10 seconds; the light is white; the light is 15 metres above the chart datum  and the nominal range is  10 nautical miles.

Light patterns

Fixed light
A fixed light, abbreviated "F", is a continuous and steady light.

Flashing light
A flashing light is a rhythmic light in which the total duration of the light in each period is clearly shorter than the total duration of the darkness and in which the flashes of light are all of equal duration. It is most commonly used for a single-flashing light which exhibits only single flashes which are repeated at regular intervals, in which case it is abbreviated simply as "Fl". It can also be used with a group of flashes which are regularly repeated, in which case the abbreviation is "Fl(2)" or "Gr Fl(2)", for a group of two flashes. Another possibility is a composite group, in which successive groups in the period have different numbers of flashes, e.g. "Fl. (2+1)" indicates a group of two flashes, followed by one flash.

A specific case sometimes used is when the flashes are longer than two seconds. Such a light is sometimes denoted "long flashing" with the abbreviation "L.Fl".

If the frequency of flashes is large (more than 30 or 50 per minute) the light is denoted as a "quick light", see below.

Occulting light

An occulting light is a rhythmic light in which the duration of light in each period is longer than the total duration of darkness. In other words, it is the opposite to a flashing light where the total duration of darkness is longer than the duration of light. It has the appearance of flashing off, rather than flashing on. Like a flashing light, it can be used for a single occulting light that exhibits only a single period of darkness or the periods of darkness can be grouped and repeated at regular intervals (abbreviated "Oc"), a group (Oc(3)) or a composite group (Oc(2+1)).

The term occulting is used because originally the effect was obtained by a mechanism (e.g. a vertical or rotating shutter) periodically shading the light from view.

Isophase light
An isophase light, abbreviated "Iso", is a light which has dark and light periods of equal length. The prefix derives from the Greek iso- meaning "same".

Quick light
A quick light, abbreviated "Q", is a special case of a flashing light with a large frequency (more than 30 or 50 per minute). If the sequence of flashes is interrupted by regularly repeated eclipses of constant and long duration, the light is denoted "interrupted quick", abbreviated "I.Q".

Group notation similar to flashing and occulting lights is also sometimes used, e.g. Q(9).

Another distinction sometimes made is between quick (more than 50 and less than 80 flashes per minute), very quick (more than 80 and less than 160 flashes per minutes, abbreviated "V.Q") and ultra quick (no less than 160 flashes per minute, abbreviate "U.Q"). This can be combined with notations for interruptions, e.g. I.U.Q for interrupted ultra quick, or grouping, e.g. V.Q(9) for a very quick group of nine flashes. Quick characteristics can also be followed by other characteristics, e.g. VQ(6) LFl for a very quick group of six flashes, followed by a long flash.

Morse code
A Morse code light is light in which appearances of light of two clearly different durations (dots and dashes) are grouped to represent a character or characters in the Morse Code. For example, "Mo(A)" is a light in which in each period light is shown for a short period (dot) followed by a long period (dash), the Morse Code for "A".

Fixed and flashing
A fixed and flashing light, abbreviated "F. Fl", is a light in which a fixed low intensity light is combined with a flashing high intensity light.

Alternating
An alternating light, abbreviated "Al", is a light which shows alternating colors. For example, "Al WG" shows white and green lights alternately.

Class of light
{| class="wikitable" width="90%" align="center"
|+ Table I
! style="background:#efefef;" | Class of Light
! style="background:#efefef;" | Feature
! style="background:#efefef;" | Abbr.
! style="background:#efefef;" | Definition
! style="background:#efefef;" | Example
! style="background:#efefef;" | Representation
|- 
| colspan="2" align="left" |
    
| align="center" |F
| align="left" | A continuous, steady, light.
| align="center" | F R
| style="background:#3CB371;" align="center" | 
|- 
| colspan="6" align="left" |
 
|- align="center"
| 
| align="left" | 2.1 Single-occulting
| align="center |Oc
| align="left" | A dark period is repeated regularly.
| Oc R 6s
| style="background:#3CB371;" | 
|- align="center" 
| 
| align="left" | 2.2 Group-occulting
| align="center |Oc(x)
| align="left" | A group of dark periods are repeated regularly.
| Oc(2) G 8s
| style="background:#3CB371;" | 
|- align="center" 
| 
| align="left" | 2.3 Composite group-occulting
| align="center |Oc(x+y)
| align="left" | Light similar to group-occulting, except that successive groups in the same period contain different numbers of dark periods.
| Oc(2+3) W 18s
| style="background:#3CB371;" | 
|- 
| colspan="2" align="left" |
    
| align="center" | Iso
| align="left" | The duration of the light and dark periods are equal.
| align="center" | Iso R 4s
| style="background:#3CB371;" align="center" | 
|- 
| colspan="6" |
    
|- align="center"
| 
| align="left" | 4.1 Single-flashing
| align="center |Fl
| align="left" | A flash is repeated regularly at a rate below 50 per minute.
| Fl G 5s
| style="background:#3CB371;" | 
|- align="center" 
| 
| align="left" | 4.2 Long-flashing
| align="center |L.Fl
| align="left" | A light flash, duration of more than 2 seconds (long flash) is repeated regularly.
| L.Fl W 10s
| style="background:#3CB371;" | 
|- align="center"
|  
| align="left" | 4.3 Group-flashing
| align="center |Fl(x)
| align="left" | A group of a specific number of flashes are repeated regularly.
| Fl(3) R 15s
| style="background:#3CB371;" | 
|- align="center"
| 
| align="left" | 4.4 Composite group-flashing
| align="center |Fl(x+y)
| align="left" | Similar to group-flashing, but with several groups of flashes.
| Fl(2+1) W 15s
| style="background:#3CB371;" | 
|- 
| colspan="6" align="left" |
    
|- align="center"
| 
| align="left" | 5.1 Continuous quick
| align="center |Q
| align="left" | Quick flashes are repeated regularly.
| Q W
| style="background:#3CB371;" | 
|- align="center" 
| 
| align="left" | 5.2 Group quick
| align="center |Q(x)
| align="left" | Groups of a given number of quick flashes are repeated regularly.
| Q(3) G 9s 
| style="background:#3CB371;" | 
|- align="center"
|  
| align="left" | 5.3 Interrupted quick
| align="center |I.Q
| align="left" | The sequence of flashes is regularly interrupted by dark intervals of constant duration.
| I.Q R 14s
| style="background:#3CB371;" | 
|- 
| colspan="6" align="left" |
    
|- align="center"
| 
| align="left" | 6.1 Continuous very quick
| align="center |VQ
| align="left" | Very quick flashes are repeated regularly.
| VQ W
| style="background:#3CB371;" | 
|- align="center" 
| 
| align="left" | 6.2 Group very quick
| align="center |VQ(x)
| align="left" | Groups of a given number of very quick flashes are repeated regularly.
| VQ(3) G 4s
| style="background:#3CB371;" | 
|- align="center"
|  
| align="left" | 6.3 Interrupted very quick
| align="center |I.VQ
| align="left" | The sequence of flashes is regularly interrupted by dark intervals of constant duration.
| I.VQ R 9s
| style="background:#3CB371;" | 
|- 
| colspan="6" align="left" |
    
|- align="center"
| 
| align="left" | 7.1 Continuous ultra quick
| align="center |UQ
| align="left" | Ultra quick flashes are repeated regularly.
| UQ W
| style="background:#3CB371;" | 
|- align="center" 
| 
| align="left" | 7.2 Interrupted ultra quick
| align="center |I.UQ
| align="left" | The sequence of ultra quick flashes is regularly interrupted by dark intervals of constant duration.
| I.UQ R 6s
| style="background:#3CB371;" | 
|- 
| colspan="2" align="left" |
    
| align="center" | Mo(x)
| align="left" | The flashes have markedly different durations and are grouped together to form one or more characters in Morse code.
| align="center" | Mo(K) G 6s
| style="background:#3CB371;" align="center" |
|- 
| colspan="2" align="left" |
    
| align="center" | F.Fl
| align="left" | A light that combines a fixed light with a light flashing with a stronger intensity. The flashes of light may have any of the features described in above.
| align="center" | F.Fl Y 5s
| style="background:#3CB371;" align="center" |
|- 
| colspan="2" align="left" |
    
| align="center" | Al
| align="left" | Light that alternately displays different colors  Note - The alternating light can be used in conjunction with most of the lights earlier classes.
| align="center" | Al WR 3s
| style="background:#3CB371;" align="center" |
|- 
|}

See also

Lighthouse
Pilotage
Signal lamp

Notes

References

 - Glossary to Aids of Navigation Terms  in any of the volumes
 p. XII - Characteristics of Lights, in any of the volumes
Glossary of Lighthouse Terms

External links
U.S. ATON light characteristic terms illustrated

Lighthouse fixtures
Maritime signalling
Navigation